Ida Lewis "Queen Ida" Guillory (born January 15, 1929) is a Louisiana Creole accordionist. She was the first female accordion player to lead a zydeco band. Queen Ida's music is an eclectic mix of R&B, Caribbean, and Cajun, though the presence of her accordion always keeps it traditional.

Biography

Born Ida Lee Lewis to a musical family of rice farmers in Lake Charles, Louisiana, United States, her family were Louisiana Creole people and her first language is French. Her family moved to Beaumont, Texas, when she was ten and eight years later moved to San Francisco, California. Although her mother was an accordion player, women were not encouraged to play in public, and Queen Ida learned mostly from her brother Al Lewis, later known as Al Rapone. After marrying Raymond Guillory she raised their three children and worked as a bus driver but occasionally sat in with her brother's Zydeco band, also cooking Louisiana cuisine for the band members. She was dubbed "Queen Ida" after being chosen queen of a Mardi Gras celebration. A year after her first appearance on stage Queen Ida and the Bon Temps Band signed with the record label GNP/Crescendo, and her first record Play the Zydeco demonstrated her style combining Zydeco with a Tex Mex sound.

Queen Ida and her band played at the Monterey Jazz Festival in 1976 and 1988, and the San Francisco Blues Festival in 1975, 1978, and 1991. In 1988, Queen Ida toured Japan, becoming the first zydeco artist to do so. She toured Africa the following year and in 1990 went to Australia and New Zealand.

On the album Back on the Bayou (1999), Queen Ida got together on the bayou in Louisiana with her brother, Al Rapone, for a zydeco reunion. Rapone often wrote and produced for her and formed the Bon Temps Zydeco Band, which later became Queen Ida's backup group. Doubling up on accordions with her oldest son Myrick "Freeze" Guillory, they are joined by Terry Buddingh on bass, James Santiago on guitar, Bernard Anderson on saxophone, Erik Nielsen on drums, and her youngest daughter Ledra Guillory and son Ron "The Rock" Guillory on rub board and vocals. As "Queen Ida and the Bon Temps Zydeco Band," the ensemble was the musical guest on Saturday Night Live on November 23, 1985, with Paul Reubens as host.

Queen Ida also co-authored a cookbook, Cookin' with Queen Ida in 1990, which featured Creole recipes. A revised second edition of the cookbook was published in 1995.

Queen Ida continued to perform live through the 2000s, and though she did not release any albums during this period, she has joined her son Myrick and his band onstage. She officially retired from playing in 2010 and lives in the San Francisco Bay Area, where she enjoys cooking for her friends and family.

One of her accordions is among the artifacts exhibited at the National Museum of African American Music in Nashville, Tennessee, which opened in January 2021.

Selected discography

Awards and honors
She is a recipient of a 2009 National Heritage Fellowship awarded by the National Endowment for the Arts, which is the United States government's highest honor in the folk and traditional arts.

Grammy Awards
Won: 1
Nominations: 4

Blues Music Awards
Won: 2
Nominations: 4

References

External links
 
 
Queen Ida info
Queen Ida video
Queen Ida at GNP Crescendo
NEA podcast with Queen Ida

1929 births
Living people
American accordionists
GNP Records artists
Grammy Award winners
Louisiana Creole people
Musicians from Lake Charles, Louisiana
Zydeco accordionists
National Heritage Fellowship winners
21st-century accordionists
Women accordionists
20th-century accordionists
20th-century American women musicians
21st-century American women musicians
20th-century American musicians
21st-century American musicians